Heywood and Middleton is a constituency in Greater Manchester represented in the House of Commons of the UK Parliament since 2019 by Chris Clarkson of the Conservative Party.

Constituency profile
The constituency covers the west half of the Metropolitan Borough of Rochdale, including the towns of Heywood and Middleton, and some of the western fringes of Rochdale itself such as Castleton. Norden and Bamford are strong Conservative areas, with several million-pound houses, but all other wards are mostly favourable to Labour. Middleton includes the large overspill council estate of Langley though the South Middleton ward includes a relatively affluent area in Alkrington Garden Village, but even this ward generally returns Labour councillors.

Electoral Calculus categorises the seat as a "Somewhere" demographic, indicating socially conservative, economically soft left views and strong support for Brexit.

Boundaries 

1983–1997: The Borough of Rochdale wards of Heywood North, Heywood South, Heywood West, Middleton Central, Middleton East, Middleton North, Middleton South, and Middleton West.

1997–2010: The Borough of Rochdale wards of Castleton, Heywood North, Heywood South, Heywood West, Middleton Central, Middleton East, Middleton North, Middleton South, Middleton West, and Norden and Bamford.

2010–present: The Borough of Rochdale wards of Bamford, Castleton, East Middleton, Hopwood Hall, Norden, North Heywood, North Middleton, South Middleton, West Heywood, and West Middleton.

History 
The constituency was created in 1983 from parts of the former seats of Heywood and Royton and Middleton and Prestwich and had been held by the Labour Party since then until the 2019 Election.

From 1983 until his retirement in 1997, the MP was Jim Callaghan, not to be confused with a former Prime Minister with the same name.

In a 2014 by-election UKIP came within 617 votes of winning the seat, which was on the same day as the Rochester and Strood by-election, and in 2015 it produced one of their largest results in the country, as a result the constituency heavily voted to Leave in the referendum and swung to the Conservatives for the first time in 2019, in line with many other Leave-voting Labour seats in the North and Midlands.

Members of Parliament

Elections

Elections in the 2010s

Elections in the 2000s

Elections in the 1990s

Elections in the 1980s

See also 
 List of parliamentary constituencies in Greater Manchester

References

Parliamentary constituencies in Greater Manchester
Constituencies of the Parliament of the United Kingdom established in 1983
Politics of the Metropolitan Borough of Rochdale
Middleton, Greater Manchester
Heywood, Greater Manchester